Flavio de Britto Pereira Tenius (born 8 May 1970) is a Brazilian retired footballer who played as a goalkeeper, and is the current goalkeeping coach of Fluminense Football Club.

Playing career
Tenius finished his formation with Bonsucesso before spending three years at Botafogo. He started to appear regularly with Serrano-RJ in 1986, and went on to represent Olaria, Vasco da Gama and São Cristóvão.

Coaching career
After retiring Tenius started working as a goalkeeping coach, initially with Flamengo. He subsequently worked with Cruzeiro, Corinthians, Atlético Mineiro and Botafogo.

On 17 November 2011, after the dismissal of Caio Júnior, Tenius was named interim manager of Botafogo's main squad. His reign lasted three matches (one draw and two defeats), and he returned to his previous role after the appointment of Oswaldo de Oliveira.

On 16 December 2014, was named the new goalkeeping coach of another club he represented as a player, Vasco. On 15 August 2016, he returned to Bota under the same role.

On 28 October 2020, Tenius was again appointed interim manager of Botafogo after the dismissal of Bruno Lazaroni.

References

External links

1964 births
Living people
Brazilian footballers
Association football goalkeepers
Botafogo de Futebol e Regatas players
Serrano Football Club players
Olaria Atlético Clube players
CR Vasco da Gama players
São Cristóvão de Futebol e Regatas players
Brazilian football managers
Campeonato Brasileiro Série A managers
Botafogo de Futebol e Regatas managers